Nicolás Ledezma is a paralympic athlete from Mexico competing mainly in category T11 long-distance events.

Nicolas won a bronze medal in the T10 marathon in the 1996 Summer Paralympics.  He could not improve on this performance in the 2000 Summer Paralympics despite competing in the 1500m, 5000m, 10000m and marathon only winning the bronze in the 5000m.

References

Paralympic athletes of Mexico
Mexican male middle-distance runners
Mexican male long-distance runners
Mexican male marathon runners
Athletes (track and field) at the 1996 Summer Paralympics
Athletes (track and field) at the 2000 Summer Paralympics
Paralympic bronze medalists for Mexico
Living people
Medalists at the 1996 Summer Paralympics
Medalists at the 2000 Summer Paralympics
Year of birth missing (living people)
Paralympic medalists in athletics (track and field)
Medalists at the 2007 Parapan American Games
Visually impaired middle-distance runners
Visually impaired long-distance runners
Visually impaired marathon runners
Paralympic middle-distance runners
Paralympic long-distance runners
Paralympic marathon runners